Rear Admiral John Robert Hamilton Clink,  (born 18 February 1964) is a former Royal Navy officer who retired from the Royal Navy in 2018.

Early life and education
Clink was born on 18 February 1964. He was educated at Cheltenham Grammar School, then an all-boys state grammar school. He studied international security and strategy at King's College London, graduating with a Master of Arts (MA) degree in 2012.

Naval career
In the latter role he commanded Combined Task Force 150, a multinational naval task force working under a 25 nation coalition of Combined Maritime Forces based in Bahrain. He went on to be Commander British Forces Gibraltar in November 2012, Flag Officer Scotland, Northern England, Northern Ireland in the rank of rear admiral in August 2014 and Flag Officer Sea Training in 2015.

Clink was appointed Officer of the Order of the British Empire (OBE) in 2002 and Commander of the Order of the British Empire (CBE) in the 2017 Birthday Honours.

References

|-

1964 births
Alumni of King's College London
Commanders of the Order of the British Empire
Living people
Royal Navy rear admirals
Royal Navy personnel of the Iraq War
Royal Navy personnel of the War in Afghanistan (2001–2021)